Builth Wells is a market town and community in the county of Powys and historic county of Brecknockshire (Breconshire), mid Wales, lying at the confluence of rivers Wye and Irfon, in the Welsh (or upper) part of the Wye Valley. In 2011 it had a population of 2,568.

Etymology

Builth is a longstanding anglicization of the Old Welsh Buellt/Buallt, which combines bu "ox" and gellt (later gwellt) "lea or leas".

The town added "Wells" in the 19th century when its springs were promoted as a visitor attraction. Its modern Welsh name Llanfair-ym-Muallt means "Saint Mary in Ox Leas".

Governance
Builth Wells is in the Brecon and Radnorshire constituency for elections to the UK parliament and a constituency of the same name for elections to the Senedd.

For elections to Powys County Council the town's boundaries are coterminous with the Builth electoral ward, which sends one county councillor to sit on the council. Since 1995 the ward had been represented by Independent councillors. At the May 2017 elections the seat was won by former international rugby player, Jeremy Pugh, after Avril York resigned in December 2016 to move to Hong Kong.

Town councillors are elected every four years to serve on Builth Wells Town Council and represent the interests of the town's residents.

Livestock breeds

The White Bull of Builth may be a reference to a herd of White Park Cattle that lived in the area from Post-Roman times. Two herds survived in Wales to modern times. The laws of the time suggest that the medieval and later economy of the Welsh borders was strongly dependent on cattle. The Hereford cattle breed, named after Hereford market where it was most prominently sold was the main breed of the Welsh borders. Builth was the market for a variant of the Hereford called the Builth Smokey Face. This was the traditional animal of the area but the breed has not existed for many, many decades.

The Beulah Speckled Face is a local breed of sheep. Nearby Mynydd Epynt was famous for its horses until it was seized for military training purposes.

The beef cattle market has vanished and economically sheep are now vastly more important than cattle with consequences for the traditional woodlands of the area, the salmon runs and other important ecological features.

Industry
Many of the town's buildings, including the 1876 Market Hall, were built from stone from Llanelwedd Quarry. Much of the facing and other dressed stone used in the construction of the Elan Valley dams was also quarried here. The quarry produced the first occurrence of laumontite in Wales. The quarry is operated by Hanson Aggregates.

Transport

The town is served by Builth Road railway station on the Heart of Wales Line, which is located just over 2 miles to the north-west. The more central (Builth Wells) railway station on the Mid-Wales Railway was opened in 1864, and closed with the line in 1962 – actually before the Beeching Axe. It was located across the river, next to the present showground.

A dedicated cycle route linking the town with Swansea (NCR 43) has been proposed and a 13-mile section of the route from Swansea has already been developed.

One of the main Wales north-south trunk roads, the A483, passes through the town, using the former railway route. As of June 2009 part of this road, along with the other main route through town (A470), is the subject of a transport study by the Welsh Assembly to help alleviate traffic congestion in the town centre.

The 18th-century bridge at Builth Wells carries heavy vehicles on the A470. It has six fine masonry spans, with relatively small round cutwaters, which are fitted on the upstream side with stout steel fenders to provide protection from debris. The centre of the bridge has a pedestrian refuge on each side. The bridge was built in 1775 and widened in 1925. The river here marks the boundary between the old counties of Breconshire and Radnorshire.

Education and recreation
Ysgol Calon Cymru is the main secondary school and is bilingual. It replaced Builth Wells High School in September 2018 and can draw on certain specialist teachers and facilities as is dual campus with its other site in Llandrindod Wells. In 2000 its predecessor was placed 67th in Wales (by percentage of its children, 59%, gaining 5 GCSEs at full pass grades A*–C). According to a 2010 report by Estyn its rate rose to 77%, making it 9th best performing (state secondary) in Wales and the only ranking in Powys after Llanidloes High School. A fall to two years of Special Measures was followed in 2017 by the closing report of the old school finding sufficient progress to remove it from those measures. Progress was ranked as strong as to six recommendations of 2015, in 2017, and sufficient progress as to the other.

The town features Wyeside Arts Centre, which has two cinemas and a live performance stage.

Builth Wells has a rugby union team called Builth Wells RFC, also known as 'The Bulls', who play on the Groe. The team play in the WRU SWALEC National League 2.

The town's football team is Builth Wells F.C. who play in the Ardal Leagues, the third tier of Welsh football.

Builth Male Voice Choir has approximately fifty members and performs concerts to support local and national charities.

Builth Wells also has a cricket pitch, tennis courts, a sports centre with squash courts, a 25m swimming pool and a bowling green.

Notable people
See :Category:People from Builth Wells.
 Caesar Jenkyns (1866–1941), footballer with over 200 club caps and 8 for Wales
 Percy Benzie Abery (1876–1948), photographer, settled locally in 1898
 Grenville Morris (1877–1959), footballer with over 450 club caps and 21 for Wales
 David Milwyn Duggan (1879–1942), Canadian politician, emigrated in 1905
 Hilda Vaughan (1892–1985), novelist and short story writer
 Kevin Sheedy (born 1959), a football coach and former player with 391 club caps and 46 for Republic of Ireland.
 Iolo Williams (born 1962), ornithologist, nature observer, TV presenter and author
 Alice Hart-Davis (born 1963), journalist and author

Buildings and landmarks

Builth Wells has a large number of Grade II listed buildings and fixtures.

A plaque on the wall of the post office stakes its claim as the only in England and Wales to bear a contemporary inscription to less-than-one-year monarch Edward VIII. The claim can be qualified to active post offices as the former one in Bradford-on-Avon has a similar insignia.

After a small health centre opened in the town, Builth Wells Hospital closed in 2013.

References

External links
BBC Wales feature on Builth Wells life 
www.geograph.co.uk : photos of Builth Wells and surrounding area

 
Market towns in Wales
Spa towns in Wales
Towns in Powys